NGC 800, also called UGC 1526 is a spiral galaxy located in the constellation of Cetus. It was first observed by the American astronomer Lewis Swift in 1885.

References

External links
 

Unbarred spiral galaxies
0800
01526
18851009
Cetus (constellation)
007740